Ophir (sometimes spelled Ofir) is a region mentioned in the Bible that was famous for its wealth.  It may also refer to:

People
Ophir is used as a first and last name among people of Jewish heritage and others. One of the common Hebrew translations for Goldman and Goldstein:
 Ophir, one of the sons of Joktan (Genesis 10:29)
Ophir Pines-Paz, the interior minister of Israel, a Knesset member and one of the prominent members of the Israeli Labor Party
Ofir Netzer, Israeli artistic gymnast
Ophira Eisenberg, Canadian comedian and writer
Adi Ophir, an Israeli philosopher at Tel Aviv University
Shaike Ophir was an Israeli film actor, mime and comedian, considered one of the most important entertainers in Israel from the 1950s up to the 1980s

Places

United States
Ophir, Alaska, an abandoned gold-rush town
Ophir, California, a town
Ophir, Colorado, a town
Ophir, Kentucky, a town
Ophir, Oregon, an unincorporated community 
Ophir, Utah, a town
Mount Ophir, California, a ghost town

Other places
Colonia Ofir, a Russian settlement in Uruguay
Mount Ophir, a mountain in Johor, Malaysia
Ophir, New South Wales, a locality where gold was first discovered in Australia in 1851
Ophir, New Zealand, a small town in Central Otago
Ophir, Ontario, a farming community in Canada
Ophir Chasma, a canyon on the planet Mars

Other uses
 SS Ophir (ship), a British steel twin-screw ocean liner, built in 1891
 Ophir Award, the most important Israeli film award named after Shaike Ophir
 Ophir Energy, oil and gas exploration company
 Ophir (Conan), a nation in the fictional world of Conan the Barbarian

See also
Orphir, Orkney, Scotland